INTLAB (INTerval LABoratory) is an interval arithmetic library using MATLAB and GNU Octave, available in Windows and Linux, macOS. It was developed by S.M. Rump from Hamburg University of Technology. INTLAB was used to develop other MATLAB-based libraries such as VERSOFT and INTSOLVER, and it was used to solve some problems in the Hundred-dollar, Hundred-digit Challenge problems.

Version history
 12/30/1998 Version 1
 03/06/1999 Version 2
 11/16/1999 Version 3
 03/07/2002 Version 3.1
 12/08/2002 Version 4
 12/27/2002 Version 4.1
 01/22/2003 Version 4.1.1
 11/18/2003 Version 4.1.2
 04/04/2004 Version 5
 06/04/2005 Version 5.1
 12/20/2005 Version 5.2
 05/26/2006 Version 5.3
 05/31/2007 Version 5.4
 11/05/2008 Version 5.5
 05/08/2009 Version 6
 12/12/2012 Version 7
 06/24/2013 Version 7.1
 05/10/2014 Version 8
 01/22/2015 Version 9
 12/07/2016 Version 9.1
 05/29/2017 Version 10
 07/24/2017 Version 10.1
 12/15/2017 Version 10.2
 01/07/2019 Version 11
 03/06/2020 Version 12

Functionality
INTLAB can help users to solve the following mathematical/numerical problems with interval arithmetic.

Works cited by INTLAB
INTLAB is based on the previous studies of the main author, including his works with co-authors.

External links

See also
 List of numerical analysis software
 Comparison of linear algebra libraries

References

Numerical analysis
Numerical software
Computational science
Computer arithmetic